For much of the late 19th and early 20th century, New York City maintained a fleet of ten fireboats. In recent decades technology has improved to where smaller boats can provide the pumping capacity that required a large boat in the past. These smaller boats require smaller crews, and the crews themselves require less training.  Like many other cities the FDNY operates a fleet with a smaller number of large fireboats, supplemented by a number of unnamed boats in the 10 meter range.

References

External links
 

 
Water transportation in New York City